Ho Chi Minh University of Banking is a university in Ho Chi Minh City, Vietnam. The university provides graduate and postgraduate level education in finance, banking and business administration. There are five faculties: Finance, International Financial Market, International Finance and Banking, Financial Institutions Management, and Foreign Languages. There are 168 lecturers and professors, of which 30 are doctors, 50 are masters. The university campuses are at 36 Ton That Dam street, District 1 and at 56 Hoang Dieu 2 street, Thủ Đức, Ho Chi Minh City.

History
The predecessor of this banking university was a banking school founded in 1976 in Ho Chi Minh City after the Fall of Saigon. In 1998, this school was incorporated into Banking Institute (Vietnam) with the headquarters campus in Hanoi and became a branch of Banking Institute in Ho Chi Minh City. On 19 January 2004, Vietnamese prime minister Phan Văn Khải signed a Decision to establish Banking University of Ho Chi Minh City on the basis of this branch. On January 19, 2004, this university was assigned to provide education of doctoral degree and master's degree.

The university has cooperation with University of Bolton (UK) and Asian Institute of Technology in education.

External links
 

Universities in Ho Chi Minh City
Banking schools